Antique Jewelry or Estate Jewelry (or Estate Jewellery), in a formal sense, is jewelry and often timepieces which are part of the 'estate' of a deceased person.  More specifically, the term refers to second-hand or pre-owned jewelry, with the 'estate' appellation signifying that the item is antique, vintage or an otherwise considered a significant or important piece.

References

Types of jewellery